UFOs: Seeing Is Believing is a two-hour American television special documentary film that aired on ABC on February 24, 2005. The program is narrated by Peter Jennings and features UFOs. It was produced by PJ Productions and Springs Media for ABC News.

The documentary mentions:
 UFO sightings (Kenneth Arnold sighting, Phoenix Lights, Illinois police "black triangle" sighting incident): features CSICOP scientific consultant James McGaha, Seth Shostak and Jill Tarter of the SETI Institute, J. Allen Hynek
 the alleged Roswell UFO incident: features clips from Unsolved Mysteries and X-Files; Stanton Friedman
 alien abductions: features clip from Taken; hypnotist Hopkins, psychologist Susan Clancy
 space travel: features clips from Star Wars: Episode II – Attack of the Clones and Star Trek; Michio Kaku

The documentary has since aired on the National Geographic Channel.

References

External links
https://abcnews.go.com/Technology/Primetime/story?id=468496, ABC News: "The UFO Phenomenon -- Seeing Is Believing"
 
Committee for Skeptical Inquiry: Doubt and About: Out of Balance
Seattle Post: What's on Peter Jennings' radar? The truth about UFOs

UFO-related television
American documentary television films
2005 documentary films
Paranormal television
Documentary films about the paranormal
2005 films
2000s English-language films
2000s American films